Carlos Esteban rose to fame while co-hosting the hit television game show "Dame Un Break" alongside Dagmar. Also famous for his portrayal of a broke down family man in the "La Fiebre" television movie saga.

His most famous role is in the 2005 film "Cayo", which started a huge cult following in his native island of Puerto Rico.

Besides his work in local films and television shows, he has been known to participate in plays as well, most recently starring as "Edipo" in "Edipo Rey", for which he received great reviews. (El Nuevo Dia, Oct. 2005)

Filmography
Animal (2005)  ... Big Dre
Cayo (2005) ... Ivan
La Fiebre 1 & 2 (2002) ... Gas Attendant
Undercurrent (1999) ... Detective Duarte
Tres destinos (1993) television series
Dame Un Break (1992–1996) television game show

References

Year of birth missing (living people)
Living people
20th-century Puerto Rican male actors
Puerto Rican male film actors
21st-century Puerto Rican male actors
Puerto Rican male television actors
Place of birth missing (living people)